Patricia (Trish) Madigan OP (born 1950) is an Australian religious sister, a member of The Dominican Sisters of Eastern Australia and the Solomon Islands and Executive Director of the Dominican Centre for Interfaith Ministry Education and Research (CIMER).

Early life and education 
Patricia Madigan was born in 1950. She entered the religious life and became a religious sister as a member of The Dominican Sisters of Eastern Australia and the Solomon Islands.

Career 
After beginning her career as a secondary school teacher and university chaplain, Madigan has worked predominantly in ecumenical and interfaith ministry in Sydney, Australia. She was a foundation member of the Women's Interfaith Network (WIN) in Sydney and a Christian representative on the Australian National Dialogue of Christians, Muslims and Jews (ANDCMJ), Australia's peak inter-religious body and was the former Director of the Commission for Ecumenical and Interfaith Relations in the Catholic Diocese of Broken Bay (2003–2013) and the Catholic Archdiocese of Sydney (1997–2003).

Interfaith work 
Between 2004 and 2012 Madigan was an Australian delegate at five regional inter-governmental conferences of the Asia-Pacific Regional Dialogue on Interfaith Cooperation for Peace and Harmony. In 2002 she participated in a Consultation of the Pontifical Council for Inter-Religious Dialogue for the Asian region held in Seoul, South Korea. 

She is a former member of the Australian Catholic Bishops' Advisory Committee for Ecumenical and Interfaith Relations and the former Chair of the Australian Catholic Bishops' Council for Australian Catholic Women (CACW).

Writing and research 
After the Arab Spring, Madigan published Women and Fundamentalism in Islam and Catholicism, one reviewer noted the timeliness of her work as much as its content.

Publications 

 "Be patient, ladies! Be patient!": Women and the Australian church (WATAC), 1982-2021', The Australasian Catholic Record, 2021, 98(3), pp. 259–283. https://search.informit.org/doi/10.3316/informit.991609482579678
'Women Changing the Church: The Experience of the Council for Australian Catholic Women 2000–2019', in Mark D. Chapman & Vladimir Latinovic (eds.), Changing the Church : Transformations of Christian Belief, Practice, and Life. Cham: Springer International Publishing AG, 2020. 
'Women during and after Vatican II', in Vladimir Latinovic, Gerard Mannion & Jason Welle (eds.), Catholicism opening to the world and other confessions: Vatican II and its impact, Palgrave Macmillan, Switzerland, 2018. 
'"Nostra Aetate" and fifty years of interfaith dialogue – changes and challenges', Journal of the Australian Catholic Historical Society, 2015, (36), pp. 179–191. https://search.informit.org/doi/10.3316/informit.876592262792089
Women and Fundamentalism in Islam and Catholicism: Negotiating Modernity in a Globalized World. Peter Lang, Bern, 2011, pp. vii + 346.

References 

 1950 births
Living people
21st-century Australian Roman Catholic nuns
Dominican Sisters
20th-century Australian Roman Catholic nuns
 Australian feminist writers
 Australian women non-fiction writers